The Menlo Park City School District is a public school district in the San Francisco Bay Area, primarily serving the communities of Menlo Park and Atherton. Through the Tinsley Voluntary Transfer Program the district allows students from East Palo Alto and eastern Menlo Park to attend MPCSD schools.

Schools

Middle school
 Hillview Middle School (PTO Website, District School Website)

Elementary schools
 Oak Knoll School (K–5)
 Laurel School (K–5) (Website)
 Encinal School (K–5) (Website)

References

External links

 
 Menlo Park Atherton Education Foundation website
 Hillview Parent Teacher Organization (PTO) Website
 Hillview Website

School districts in San Mateo County, California
Menlo Park, California